In geometry, a hypotrochoid is a roulette traced by a point attached to a circle of radius  rolling around the inside of a fixed circle of radius , where the point is a distance  from the center of the interior circle.

The parametric equations for a hypotrochoid are:

where  is the angle formed by the horizontal and the center of the rolling circle (these are not polar equations because  is not the polar angle).

The eccentricity of the ellipse is

becoming 1 when  (see Tusi couple).

The classic Spirograph toy traces out hypotrochoid and epitrochoid curves.

Hypotrochoids describe the support of the eigenvalues of some random matrices with cyclic correlations

See also
 Cycloid
 Cyclogon
 Epicycloid 
 Rosetta (orbit)
 Apsidal precession
 Spirograph

References

External links

Flash Animation of Hypocycloid
Hypotrochoid from Visual Dictionary of Special Plane Curves, Xah Lee
Interactive hypotrochoide animation

Roulettes (curve)

de:Zykloide#Epi- und Hypozykloide
ja:トロコイド#内トロコイド